Valeriu Ghileţchi (born 8 July 1960) is a Moldovan Baptist clergyman and politician.

Biography 

Working originally as an engineer, Ghileţchi was ordained Baptist pastor in 1996 following a programme of theological studies at Emmanuel Baptist University in Oradea, Romania. He holds undergraduate diploma in theology.

Since 1994, he served as rector of the Holy Trinity Moldovan Baptist Institute and then as Academic Dean of the College of Theology and Education in Chisinau, Rep. Moldova.

He served for two periods as bishop of the Union of Christian Evangelical Baptist Churches of Moldova.

At present time Ghiletchi is associate pastor at Jesus the Savior Baptist Church in Chisinau, Rep. Moldova.

Valeriu Ghileţchi was vice-president of the European Baptist Federation (EBF) from 2007 to 2009 and has been the president of EBF in 2009–2011.

Hs is a member of the parliament of Moldova. Previously affiliated with Liberal Democratic Party of Moldova (PLDM) of Vladimir Filat, Ghiletchi changed his party affiliation to People's European Party (PPE) of Iurie Leanca.

He is a member of the Parliamentary Assembly of the Council of Europe since January 2010 (after a first term between 1998 and 2001). In this capacity, he served as Chair of the Social Affairs Committee. He was also the rapporteur on "Fighting Child Sex Tourism" and a member of the Parliamentary Network of Contact Parliamentarians to stop sexual violence against children for Moldova.

External links 
 European Baptists Elect a New President: Valeriu Ghiletchi
 Moldovan Parliament Website
 Liberal Democratic Party of Moldova
 Personal Webpage

References

1960 births
Living people
Moldovan engineers
Moldovan Christians
Moldovan religious leaders
Moldovan MPs 2014–2018
Liberal Democratic Party of Moldova MPs
Moldovan MPs 2009–2010